The Roraiman antwren (Herpsilochmus roraimae) is an insectivorous bird in the antbird family, Thamnophilidae. It was first described by the Austrian ornithologist Carl Hellmayr in 1903 with the type locality of Mount Roraima (Venezuela).

It is found in Brazil, Guyana, and Venezuela. Its natural habitat is subtropical or tropical moist montane forests.

There are two recognized subspecies:
 Herpsilochmus roraimae katheenae Phelps Jr. & Dickerman, 1980 – tepui region of southwest Venezuela and adjacent Brazil
 Herpsilochmus roraimae roraimae Hellmayr, 1903 – tepui region of Southeast Venezuela, adjacent Brazil and Guyana.

References

Roraiman antwren
Birds of Venezuela
Roraiman antwren
Roraiman antwren
Taxonomy articles created by Polbot
Birds of the Tepuis